FC Torpedo Mogilev is a Belarusian football club based in Mogilev.

History
The club was formed in 1959 as Kirovets Mogilev. During 1962–1963, the team played in the Belarusian SSR League, before submerging to regional and city level competitions. In 1979, the club was renamed to Torpedo Mogilev and joined the Belarusian SSR top league once again. They were third in 1979 and won their only championship title in 1982.

The team began playing in the Belarusian Premier League in 1992. The first two seasons were most successful when they finished 7th (1992) and 8th (1992–93). After that, Torpedo could not get higher than 11th and mostly were struggling against relegation.

In 1996, Torpedo were renamed to Torpedo-Kadino Mogilev. In 2000, the team finished 15th and were relegated to the Belarusian First League. After playing 5 seasons in the First League (2001–2005), Torpedo-Kadino was disbanded.

In 2014, the club was reformed with the original name Torpedo Mogilev to play in the Mogilev city league, and in 2015, the club joined the Belarusian Second League. However, due to financial struggles, the club withdrew from the league after the 2016 season and is currently represented by a youth team on a city level.

Notable players
Sergei Gorlukovich, a future Olympic champion who went on to play for Spartak Moscow and Borussia Dortmund, started his youth career at Torpedo Mogilev. A number of notable Belarusian players and managers, such as Igor Kriushenko, Andrey Skorobogatko, Aleksandr Sednev, Vyacheslav Geraschenko, Oleg Kubarev, Eduard Baltrushevich, were once players of the club.

Name changes
1959: Kirovets
1974: Torpedo
1996: Torpedo-Kadino
2005: disbanded
2014: Torpedo Mogilev

Honours
 Belarusian SSR League champions (1): 1982
 Belarusian Cup runners-up (1): 1995

League and Cup history

1 Saved from relegation due to withdrawal of two higher-placed clubs.

References

External links
 Official website

Football clubs in Belarus
Association football clubs established in 1974
Association football clubs disestablished in 2005
1974 establishments in Belarus
2005 disestablishments in Belarus
Sport in Mogilev